The 28th New York Infantry Regiment, the "Niagara Rifles" or "Scott Life Guard", was an infantry regiment that served in the Union Army during the American Civil War.

Service
The regiment was organized in Albany, New York and was mustered in for a two-year enlistment on May 22, 1861.

The regiment sailed aboard the steamship Star of the South from New York Harbor for Washington, D.C. on May 2, 1861.  It arrived there four days later after a brief stop in Annapolis, Maryland.

The regiment was mustered out of service on June 2, 1863, and those men who had signed three year enlistments or who re-enlisted were transferred to the 60th New York.

Total strength and casualties
The regiment suffered 2 officers and 46 enlisted men who were killed in action or mortally wounded and 50 enlisted men who died of disease, for a total of 98 fatalities.
Private Isaac Sly, of Lockport, was the first man killed in this regiment. He was shot in the skirmish near Martinsburg on July 11, 1861.

Commanders
Colonel Dudley Donnelly
Colonel Edwin Franklin Brown

See also
List of New York Civil War regiments

Notes

References
The Civil War Archive

External links
New York State Military Museum and Veterans Research Center - Civil War - 28th Infantry Regiment History, photographs, table of battles and casualties, and historical sketch for the 28th New York Infantry Regiment.
 Re-enacting unit dedicated to preserving the history of this unit.

Infantry 028
1861 establishments in New York (state)
Military units and formations established in 1861
Military units and formations disestablished in 1863